The National Archaeology Research Institute (Indonesian: Pusat Penelitian Arkeologi Nasional, Puslit Arkenas) was a research center coordinated under the Agency of Education Standards, Curriculum, and Assessments (formerly Agency of Research and Development) of Ministry of Education, Culture, Research, and Technology. The research center was one of the oldest state research institution in Indonesia which had been operated since early of 20th century.

The agency is liquidated to the National Research and Innovation Agency and replaced as part of BRIN state research activity integration plan. It is announced on 24 January 2022 that on 1 February 2022 the institute will be amalgamated with various agencies to the newly formed Archaeology, Language, and Letters Research Organization.

History 
Puslit Arkenas foundation can be traced back to early 20th century commission Commissie in Nederlandsch Indie voor Oudheidkundige Onderzoek op Java en Madoera which was founded by Dutch East Indies colonial government on 18 May 1901 thru Gouvernement Besluit No. 4. The commission led by Dr. Jan Laurens Andries Brandes [id] and tasked for cataloging and researching discovered archaeological findings and traditional architectures scattered in Java and Madura islands. 12 years later, the commission replaced by the Oudheidkundige Dienst in Nederlandsch-Indie on 14 June 1913 Gouvernement Besluit No. 62. The Dienst (Service Agency) later become the embryo of the current Puslit Arkenas. The foundation date of the Dienst later celebrated as Hari Purbakala Nasional (English: National Prehistoric Day).

After the issue of Presidential Decree No. 62/2021 on formation of the Ministry of Education, Culture, Research, and Technology, the agency is ordered by Joko Widodo to be relinquished to National Research and Innovation Agency after the agency separation in April 2021. Minister of Education, Culture, Research, and Technology, thru the Ministry of Education, Culture, Research, and Technology Decree No. 28/2021 also confirmed the relinquishment of the institute to the BRIN. For the separation process from the ministry, the institute was moved to the Agency of Education Standards, Curriculum, and Assessments temporary supervision for administration process until the separation process finalized. On 18 November 2021, the separation was confirmed by Puslit Arkenas in the farewell event held by the Puslit Arkenas.

Names 
As one of oldest research agency in Indonesia, the agency had been changed its name for several times:

 Oudheidkundige Dienst in Nederlandsch-Indie (1913-1942)
 Office of Prehistoric Items Registry Affairs (Indonesian: Kantor Urusan Barang - barang Purbakala) (under Japanese occupation government to early Indonesian Republican government) (1942-1947)
 Dualism in 1946-1949 between:
 Office of Prehistoric Items Registry Affairs (under Indonesian Republican government)
 Oudheidkundige Dienst (under Netherlands Indies Civil Administration)
 Division of Prehistorical Affairs of United States of Indonesia Cultural Service (1949-1950).
 Oudheidkundige Dienst in Indonesië (1951-1953)
 Prehistoric Service Agency of Department of Teaching, Education, and Culture (1953-1958)
 National Prehistoric and Heritage Service (1958-1963/1964) (Indonesian:  Dinas Purbakala dan Peninggalan Nasional, DPPN)
 National Prehistoric and Heritage Institute (1963/1964-1975) (Indonesian:  Lembaga Purbakala dan Peninggalan Nasional, LPPN)
 National Prehistoric and Heritage Research Center (1975-1978) (Indonesian: Pusat Penelitian Purbakala dan Peninggalan Nasional, PusPPPN/PusP3N)
 National Archaeology Research Institute (Indonesian: Pusat Penelitian Arkeologi Nasional, Puslit Arkenas) (1978-2000)
 Archaeology Center (Indonesian: Pusat Arkeologi) (2000)
 Archaeology Research Center of State Ministry of Cultural Affairs and Tourism (Indonesian: Pusat Penelitian Arkeologi Kementerian Negara Kebudayaan dan Pariwisata) (2000-2003)
 Assistance Deputy-ship of National Archaeological Affairs(Indonesian: Keasistendeputian Urusan Arkeologi Nasional) (2003-2011)
 National Archaeology Research Institute (Indonesian: Pusat Penelitian Arkeologi Nasional, Puslit Arkenas) (name reverted, 2011-now)

As Puslit Arkenas, the institute had been subject for being transferred into various parent organization:

 Department of Education and Culture (1978-1999)
 Department of National Education (1999-2000)
 Department of Cultural Affairs and Tourism (2000-2001)
 State Ministry of Cultural Affairs and Tourism (2001-2004)
 Ministry of Cultural Affairs and Tourism (2004-2009)
 Department of Education and Cultural Affairs (2009)
 Ministry of National Education (2009 - 2011)
 Ministry of Education and Culture (2011 - 2021)
 Ministry of Education, Culture, Research, and Technology (2021)

Structure 
The institute consists of:

 Office of the Head of National Archaeology Research Institute
 Centers:
 National Archaeology Research Center Jakarta
 National Archaeology Center Yogyakarta Branch
 National Archaeology Center Denpasar Branch
 National Archaeology Center Bandung Branch
 National Archaeology Center Palembang Branch
 National Archaeology Center Manado Branch
 National Archaeology Center Medan Branch
 National Archaeology Center Banjarmasin Branch
 National Archaeology Center Makassar Branch
 National Archaeology Center Ambon Branch
 National Archaeology Center Jayapura Branch

References 

1913 establishments in the Dutch East Indies
2022 disestablishments in Indonesia
Science and technology in Indonesia
Government agencies of Indonesia
Research institutes in Indonesia